Sporher is a surname. Notable people with the surname include:

Jim Spohrer (born 1956), American computer scientist
Lauren Spohrer, American radio producer
Al Spohrer (1902–1972), American baseball player